Milad Gharibi (born February 20, 1992) is an Iranian footballer who plays for Padideh as a winger.

Club career

Saipa
Gharibi joined Saipa in 2010 after spending the previous season with Naft Gachsaran in the 2nd Division of Iranian Football. He scored his first professional league goal in a match against Foolad when he was 18 years old.

During the 2011–12 season, Gharbi provided nine assists for his teammates, the most in the league. He appeared in 29 IPL games, starting in twelve of them. He scored a total of four goals against Rah Ahan, Sanat Naft, Damash Gilan and Persepolis. In 2012–13 season, he played a total of 2066 minutes scoring three goals in the start of the season against Paykan, Sepahan and Damash Gilan, all games which Saipa won. He failed to add to his tally in 2013.

Persepolis
Gharibi joined Persepolis on 25 May 2013 on an agreement for two years. He signed his contract on 1 July 2013 after passing medical tests. He made his debut in a match against his former team Saipa and played 45 minutes.

Zob Ahan (loan)
He joined Zob Ahan on November 18, 2013 with a six months loan contract. He made 13 league appearances with Zob Ahan, scoring once before returning to his parent club Persepolis.

Padideh
He was loaned to newly promoted Iran Pro League side Padideh for the 2014–15 season.

Club career statistics

 Assists

International career

Under 17

Gharibi represented Iran U-17 in the 2009 FIFA U-17 World Cup in Nigeria.

He did not feature in Iran's first two games, however he started and scored the sole goal in Iran's final group match against the Netherlands. He was also subbed in on the 85th min in the round of 16 match against Uruguay.

Under 22

Gharibi established himself as a main figure for the under-22 in the qualification for the 2013 AFC U-22 Championship scoring two goals against the Maldives. In the 2013 Qatar Tournament he provided several assists as Iran marched onto 3 wins against, Qatar, Morocco and Turkey.

International goals

References

External links 
Milad Gharibi at PersianLeague.com
Milad Gharibi at ffiri.ir

1992 births
Living people
Saipa F.C. players
Persepolis F.C. players
Zob Ahan Esfahan F.C. players
Shahr Khodro F.C. players
Persian Gulf Pro League players
Iranian footballers
Iran under-20 international footballers
Association football forwards